The 1962 New Mexico State Aggies football team represented New Mexico State University during the 1962 NCAA University Division football season. In their fifth year under head coach Warren B. Woodson, the Aggies compiled a 4–6 record.

The team's statistical leaders included Armando Alba with 605 passing yards, Preacher Pilot with 1,247 rushing yards, and Lee Sampson and Rhome Nixon, each with 283 receiving yards. For the fourth consecutive year, a New Mexico State back won the NCAA rushing title, Pervis Atkins in 1959, Bob Gaiters in 1960, and Preacher Pilot in 1961 and 1962.

Woodson was later inducted into the College Football Hall of Fame.

Schedule

References

New Mexico State
New Mexico State Aggies football seasons
New Mexico State Aggies football